Timothy Michael Collins (born August 21, 1989) is an American former professional baseball pitcher. He played in Major League Baseball (MLB) for the Kansas City Royals, Washington Nationals, and Chicago Cubs.

Amateur career
Collins attended high school at Worcester Technical High School in Worcester, Massachusetts which compiled a record of 91–5 during his four years there. Collins was overlooked by baseball scouts because of his size, standing at only 5'7". His senior year, Collins threw a no-hitter against Auburn High School in the district championship game.

Professional career

Toronto Blue Jays

Toronto Blue Jays' general manager J. P. Ricciardi discovered Collins after he was pitching in an American Legion Baseball game. In 7 games, Collins was involved in no decisions and had an ERA of 4.50. The next season, Collins was promoted to the Class-A Lansing Lugnuts of the Midwest League. That season, Collins went 4–2 with a 1.58 ERA, 98 strikeouts, and 14 saves in 49 games, all in relief. He was fifth in the league in ERA that season. His 14 saves ranked him third in the entire Blue Jays organization in that category. In , Collins began the season with the Class-A Advanced Dunedin Blue Jays of the Florida State League. In 40 games with Dunedin, he went 7–4 with a 2.37 ERA, 99 strikeouts, and 3 saves. He was named to the Florida State League All-Star team that season. Collins was later promoted to the Double-A New Hampshire Fisher Cats of the Eastern League. Collins compiled a record of 2–3 with a 5.68 ERA, and 17 strikeouts in 9 games with New Hampshire. On the season, Collins had a combined record of 9–7 with a 2.91 ERA in 77 innings pitched. Collins was selected as the Toronto Blue Jays organization's Postseason Player of the Year by MLB.com.

Atlanta Braves
On July 14, 2010, Collins was traded to the Atlanta Braves with Tyler Pastornicky and Alex González for shortstop, Yunel Escobar and pitcher, Jo-Jo Reyes.

Kansas City Royals
On July 31, 2010, Collins was traded along with Jesse Chavez and Gregor Blanco to the Kansas City Royals for Rick Ankiel and Kyle Farnsworth.

On March 31, 2011, Collins made his MLB debut against the Los Angeles Angels of Anaheim, pitching one inning. He did not allow a run and struck out Torii Hunter for his first MLB strikeout. Three days later, he earned his first MLB victory by pitching three scoreless innings against the Angels in extra innings, striking out five. On August 14, 2012, he set the Royals single season strikeout record for a left handed reliever. Collins finished the 2012 season with 93 strikeouts, second place among all Major League left-handed relievers behind the Reds Aroldis Chapman. Overall in 2012 Collins pitched  innings with an ERA of 3.36 and a record of 5–4. On March 11, 2015, Collins underwent Tommy John surgery and was ruled out for the entire 2015 season. An MRI taken in March 2016 showed that the ligament graft performed during the operation was not successful, and another Tommy John surgery had to be performed.

Washington Nationals
On December 13, 2016, Collins signed a minor league deal with the Washington Nationals. Collins elected free agency on November 6, 2017, becoming a free agent on November 18. On December 15, 2017, Collins resigned a minor league deal with the Nationals. The Nationals purchased his contract on May 21, 2018. He made his Nationals debut and first major-league appearance since 2014 on May 21, 2018, entering a game against the San Diego Padres at Nationals Park in the eighth inning and getting two strikeouts, giving up one hit but no runs.

Minnesota Twins
On February 6, 2019, Collins signed a minor league deal with the Minnesota Twins that included an invitation to spring training. He was released on March 22, 2019.

Chicago Cubs
On March 24, 2019, Collins signed a major league contract with the Chicago Cubs. Collins was designated for assignment by the Cubs on June 19, following the promotion of Adbert Alzolay. On July 23, the Cubs selected Collins' contract. Collins was designated again on July 26 following the acquisition of Derek Holland. He elected free agency on August 1.

Cincinnati Reds
On August 4, 2019, Collins signed a minor league deal with the Cincinnati Reds. He became a free agent following the 2019 season.

Colorado Rockies
On February 5, 2020, Collins signed a minor league deal with the Colorado Rockies. On July 27, Collins announced he was opting out of the season due to the COVID-19 pandemic. He became a free agent on November 2, 2020.

Pitching style
Despite his small size, Collins garners good speed on his four-seam fastball (averaging 93–94 mph, tops out at 97 mph). He also features two effective off-speed pitches, a curveball at 74–77 mph and a changeup at 83–85 mph. The curve is his most common pitch when ahead in the count, and is a frequent offering with 2 strikes. His changeup is typically used earlier in the count and is mostly thrown to right-handed hitters. All three pitches have above-average whiff rates (including 51% for the changeup), leading to a high strikeout rate.

References

External links

1989 births
Living people
Baseball players from Worcester, Massachusetts
Chicago Cubs players
Dunedin Blue Jays players
Gulf Coast Blue Jays players
Gulf Coast Nationals players
Harrisburg Senators players
Iowa Cubs players
Kansas City Royals players
Lansing Lugnuts players
Louisville Bats players
Major League Baseball pitchers
Mississippi Braves players
New Hampshire Fisher Cats players
Omaha Royals players
Omaha Storm Chasers players
Potomac Nationals players
Syracuse Chiefs players
Washington Nationals players
World Baseball Classic players of the United States
2013 World Baseball Classic players